Dichrorampha senectana is a moth belonging to the family Tortricidae first described by Achille Guenée in 1845.

It is native to Europe.

References

Grapholitini